Mozdok is an airbase of the Russian Air Force located near Mozdok, North Ossetia–Alania, Russia.

The base is home to a detachment of the 485th Independent Helicopter Regiment.

References

Russian Air Force bases